Kings and Queens is the fourth studio album by English punk rock band, the Anti-Nowhere League.

Track listing
(all songs written by Animal/Anti-Nowhere League unless noted.)

"Degeneration" – 3:02
"Mother's Cunt" – 3:13
"Kings and Queens" – 3:33
"Just Another Day (In Paradise)" – 3:40
"Piggy (The Lesson of Life)" – 4:18
"Wet Dream" (Max Romeo) – 2:53
"Pump Action" – 4:41
"There Is no God" – 3:38
"Mission to Mars" – 4:10
"Am I Dead?" – 3:55
"Dead Heroes" – 3:43
"The Punk Prayer" – 4:17

Personnel
Animal — vocals
Jez — guitars
Shady — bass
PJ — drums

References

Anti-Nowhere League albums
2005 albums
Captain Oi! Records albums